The United States Capitol features a dome situated above its rotunda. Designed by Thomas U. Walter, the fourth Architect of the Capitol, it was constructed between 1855 and 1866 at a cost of $1,047,291 (equivalent to $ in ).

The dome is not stone, but rather cast iron carefully painted to appear to be made of the same stone as the main capitol building. The dome's cast iron frame was supplied and constructed by the iron foundry Janes, Fowler, Kirtland & Co. in the Bronx, New York. The dome marks the origin on street maps of Washington, D.C. A detailed look at the dome and its recent restoration can be found here.

First dome
The origin of the first dome began with the Capitol design contest sponsored by Secretary of State Thomas Jefferson, at the behest of President George Washington, in 1792. The winner of the contest, Doctor William Thornton, called for a dome in his original design for the building. Most vividly, Thornton drew upon the Roman Pantheon for inspiration with the Neoclassical dome and associated portico.

Thornton's replacement, Benjamin Henry Latrobe, the second Architect of the Capitol, altered Thornton's design plan on the exterior by adding an octagonal drum to visually separate the bottom of the dome from the top of the building's pediment. The third Architect of the Capitol, Charles Bulfinch, altered the exterior profile of the plans still further by increasing the dome's height, which he later wrote was at the insistence of the President and Congress.

In 1822, Bulfinch requested funds for the construction of the center of the building, and President James Monroe signed off on an appropriation of $120,000. Bulfinch completed the project in 1823. For more than two decades, the green copper dome of the Capitol greeted visitors to the nation's capitol, until the 1850s. Due to the growth of the United States and the expansion and addition of new states, the size of the U.S. Congress had grown accordingly and pushed the limits of the capacity of the Capitol. Under the guidance of the fourth Architect of the Capitol, Thomas U. Walter, extensions were built onto the north and south wings of the building. In the process, the new, longer building made the original Bulfinch dome appear aesthetically displeasing (and it had in any case been the object of much prior criticism). Congress, after lobbying by Walter and Montgomery C. Meigs (then Supervising Engineer), passed legislation to build a bigger dome in 1855.

Second (current) dome

The current cast iron dome of the United States Capitol is the second dome to sit above the building. Plans began in May 1854 to build a new cast-iron dome for the United States Capitol, sold on the aesthetics of a new dome, as well as the utility of a fire-proof one. Influenced by the great domes of Europe, Walter paid particular attention to the Pantheon of Paris, St Paul's Cathedral in London and St. Peter's Basilica in Rome, as well as the more recent  Saint Isaac's Cathedral in Saint Petersburg, Russia, one of the first domes with an iron frame, by Auguste de Montferrand (1786–1858).  William Allen, Historian of the Capitol, described Walter's first design as

... a tall, ellipsodial dome standing on a two-story drum with a ring of forty columns forming a peristyle surrounding the lower half of the drum.  The upper part of the drum was enriched with decorated pilasters upholding a bracketed attic.  Crowning the composition was a statue standing on a slender, columned tholus ...

Walter drafted a  drawing of the aforementioned design and displayed it in his office, where it drew the excited attention of members of Congress in 1854. A year later, on March 3, 1855, President Franklin Pierce signed off on the appropriation of $100,000 (equivalent to $ in ) to build the dome. Construction began after some practical changes to the original design (such as the reduction of the columns from 40 to 36) in September of that year with the removal of the dome raised by Charles Bulfinch. A unique scaffold was built inside the rotunda, designed to keep weight away from the weak center area of the floor, and a crane was set within to run on a steam-powered engine (fueled from the salvaged wood from the old dome).

Over the next 11 years, the dome designed with an interior dome and exterior dome rose over the nation's capitol. By December 2, 1863, Walter was able to set the Statue of Freedom atop the dome. This was not accomplished until after Walter had been forced to revise the design of the dome to handle the statue, which had been delivered taller and heavier than requested. Yet, the man who designed the dome did not see its total completion, because Thomas Walter resigned in 1865. His replacement, Edward Clark, assumed the role of finishing the last aspects of the dome. Just over a month later, in January 1866, Constantino Brumidi—who had been hired to paint a fresco on a platform above the interior dome's oculus—removed the scaffolding used during his work on the Apotheosis of Washington. This signaled the end of construction for the United States Capitol dome.

Some  of iron were ultimately used in the construction that ran virtually 11 years. The total cost of the dome was valued at $1,047,291 (equivalent to $ in ).

Visitation of the dome is highly restricted, usually offered only to members of Congress and their select guests. Visitors ascend a series of metal stairs between the inner and outer domes. They eventually wind their way to a balcony just underneath the Apotheosis of Washington. From this view, the painting is curved and distorted. From the balcony, metal stairs take visitors over the painting and up to the outside balcony under the tholos directly beneath the Statue of Freedom. Additional stairs lead up into the statue for maintenance.

Within the columned tholos upon which stands the Statue of Freedom, is found the Session or Convene light which signifies one or both chambers being in a night session.

Restoration and conservation of the Capitol Dome's cantilevered peristyle and skirting occurred in 2012. In 2013, the Architect of the Capitol announced a tentative four-year, $10 million project to repair and conserve the Capitol dome. The project involved both interior work to the rotunda, and exterior work on the dome. The proposal would require erecting white scaffolding around the dome, stripping the paint, repairing the ironwork, repainting the dome, and installing new lighting. The work was needed because the dome, which last underwent repair and conservation in 1960, was rusting and some ironwork had fallen from the structure. Congress had appropriated no funds for the project, however.

A $60-million, two-year restoration started in early 2014 included removing paint, priming and quickly repainting. Steel pins and "metal stitching" were used to repair cracks, and water damage inside was fixed. Scaffolding was erected around the dome in November 2014. The project was slated to be completed and the scaffolding removed in time for the 2017 presidential inauguration, and indeed all exterior scaffolding was removed by the end of summer 2016.

Papers relating to the construction of the dome are archived at the Cornell University Library as Collection No. 3244.

See also
 History of early modern period domes
 List of tallest domes
 Architecture of Washington, D.C.

Gallery

References

Footnotes

Works cited

External links
Website showing progress of renovation

Buildings and structures completed in 1866
Dome
Government buildings with domes
1866 establishments in Washington, D.C.